Charles Richard Drew (June 3, 1904 – April 1, 1950) was an American surgeon and medical researcher. He researched in the field of blood transfusions, developing improved techniques for blood storage, and applied his expert knowledge to developing large-scale blood banks early in World War II. This allowed medics to save thousands of Allied forces' lives during the war. As the most prominent African American in the field, Drew protested against the practice of racial segregation in the donation of blood, as it lacked scientific foundation, and resigned his position with the American Red Cross, which maintained the policy until 1950.

Early life and education 

Drew was born in 1904 into an African-American middle-class family in Washington, D.C. His father, Richard, was a carpet layer and his mother, Nora Burrell, trained as a teacher. Drew and three (two sisters, one brother) of his four younger siblings (three sisters and one brother total) grew up in Washington's largely middle-class and interracial Foggy Bottom neighborhood. From a young age Drew began work as a newspaper boy in his neighborhood, daily helping deliver over a thousand newspapers to his neighbors. Drew attended Washington's Dunbar High School which was well known for its equality and opportunities for all, despite the racial climate at the time. From 1920 until his marriage in 1939, Drew's permanent address was in Arlington County, Virginia, although he graduated from Washington's Dunbar High School in 1922 and resided elsewhere during that period of time.

Drew won an athletics scholarship to Amherst College in Massachusetts, where he played on the football as well as the track and field team, and later graduated in 1926. After college, Drew spent two years (1926–1928) as a professor of chemistry and biology, the first athletic director, and football coach at the historically black private Morgan College in Baltimore, Maryland, to earn the money to pay for medical school.

For his medical career Drew applied to Howard University, Harvard Medical School and later McGill University. Drew lacked some prerequisites for Howard University, and Harvard wanted to defer him a year, so to begin medical school promptly, Drew decided to attend medical school at McGill University in Montreal, Quebec, Canada. It was during this stage in his medical journey that Drew worked with John Beattie, who was conducting research regarding the potential correlations between transfusions of blood and shock therapy. Shock occurs as the amount of blood in the body rapidly declines which can be due to a variety of factors such as a wound or lack of fluids (dehydration). As the body goes into shock both blood pressure and body temperature decrease which then causes a lack of blood flow and a loss of oxygen in the body's tissues and cells. Eventually it became clear that transfusions were the solution to treating victims of shock, but at the time there was no successful method of transportation or mass storage of blood, leaving transfusions to be extremely limited to location.

At McGill University he achieved membership in Alpha Omega Alpha, a scholastic honor society for medical students, ranked second in his graduating class of 127 students, and received the standard Doctor of Medicine and Master of Surgery degree awarded by the McGill University Faculty of Medicine in 1933.

Drew's first appointment as a faculty instructor was for pathology at Howard University from 1935 to 1936. He then joined Freedman's Hospital, a federally operated facility associated with Howard University, as an instructor in surgery and an assistant surgeon. In 1938, Drew began graduate work at Columbia University in New York City on the award of a two-year Rockefeller fellowship in surgery. He then began postgraduate work, earning his Doctor of Science at Surgery at Columbia University. He spent time doing research at Columbia's Presbyterian Hospital and wrote a doctoral thesis, "Banked Blood: A Study on Blood Preservation," based on an exhaustive study of blood preservation techniques. It was through this blood preservation research where Drew realized blood plasma was able to be preserved, two months, longer through de-liquification, or the separation of liquid blood from the cells. When ready for use the plasma would then be able to return to its original state via reconstitution. This thesis earned him his Doctor of Science in Medicine degree in 1940, becoming the first African American to do so. The District of Columbia chapter of the American Medical Association allowed only white doctors to join, consequently "... Drew died without ever being accepted for membership in the AMA."

Blood for Britain 
In late 1940, before the U.S. entered World War II and just after earning his doctorate, Drew was recruited by John Scudder to help set up and administer an early prototype program for blood storage and preservation. Here Drew was able to apply his thesis to aid in the blood preservation and transportation. He was to collect, test, and transport large quantities of blood plasma for distribution in the United Kingdom.  Drew understood that plasma extraction from blood required both centrifugation and liquid extraction. Each extraction was conducted under controlled conditions to eliminate risk of contamination. Air concealment, ultraviolet light and Merthiolate were all used to mitigate the possibility of plasma contamination.

Drew went to New York City as the medical director of the United States' Blood for Britain project. It was here that Drew helped set the standard for other hospitals donating blood plasma to Britain by ensuring clean transfusions along with proper aseptic technique to ensure viable plasma dispersals were sent to Britain. The Blood for Britain project was a project to aid British soldiers and civilians by giving U.S. blood to the United Kingdom.

Drew created a central location for the blood collection process where donors could go to give blood. He made sure all blood plasma was tested before it was shipped out. He ensured that only skilled personnel handled blood plasma to avoid the possibility of contamination. The Blood for Britain program operated successfully for five months, with total collections of almost 15,000 people donating blood, and with over 5,500 vials of blood plasma. As a result, the Blood Transfusion Betterment Association applauded Drew for his work.

American Red Cross Blood Bank

Drew's work led to his appointment as director of the first American Red Cross Blood Bank in February 1941. The blood bank supplied blood to the U.S. Army and Navy, who ruled that the blood of African-Americans would be accepted but would have to be stored separately from that of whites. Drew objected to the exclusion of African-Americans' blood from plasma-supply networks, and in 1942 he resigned in protest.

Academic achievements 
In 1941, Drew's distinction in his profession was recognized when he became the first African-American surgeon selected to serve as an examiner on the American Board of Surgery.

Drew had a lengthy research and teaching career, returning to Freedman's Hospital and Howard University as a surgeon and professor of medicine in 1942. He was awarded the Spingarn Medal by the NAACP in 1944 for his work on the British and American projects. He was given an honorary doctor of science degree, first by Virginia State College in 1945 then by Amherst in 1947.

Personal life 

In 1939, Drew married Minnie Lenore Robbins, a professor of home economics at Spelman College in Atlanta, Georgia, whom he had met earlier during that year. They had three daughters and a son. His daughter Charlene Drew Jarvis served on Council of the District of Columbia from 1979 to 2000, was the president of Southeastern University from 1996 until 2009, and was a president of the District of Columbia Chamber of Commerce.

Death 

Beginning in 1939, Drew traveled to Tuskegee, Alabama, to attend the annual free clinic at the John A. Andrew Memorial Hospital. For the 1950 Tuskegee clinic, Drew drove along with three other black physicians. Drew was driving around 8 a.m. on April 1. Still fatigued from spending the night before in the operating theater, he lost control of the vehicle. After careening into a field, the car somersaulted three times. The three other physicians suffered minor injuries. Drew was trapped with serious wounds; his foot had become wedged beneath the brake pedal. When reached by emergency technicians, he was in shock and barely alive due to severe leg injuries. Drew was taken to Alamance General Hospital in Burlington, North Carolina. He was pronounced dead a half hour after he first received medical attention. Drew's funeral was held on April 5, 1950, at the Nineteenth Street Baptist Church in Washington, D.C.

Despite a popular myth to the contrary, once repeated on an episode ("Dear Dad... Three") of the hit TV series M*A*S*H and in the novels Carrion Comfort and The 480, Drew's death was not the result of his having been refused hospital access because of his skin color. In truth, according to John Ford, one of the passengers in Drew's car, Drew's injuries were so severe that virtually nothing could have been done to save him. Ford added that a blood transfusion might have actually killed Drew sooner. This myth spread, however, because it was not then uncommon for blacks to be refused treatment because there were not enough "Negro beds" available or the nearest hospital only serviced whites.

Legacy 

 In 1976, the National Park Service designated the Charles Richard Drew House in Arlington County, Virginia, as a National Historic Landmark in response to a nomination by the Afro-American Bicentennial Corporation.
 In 1981, the United States Postal Service issued a 35¢ postage stamp in its Great Americans series to honor Drew.
 Charles Richard Drew Memorial Bridge, spanning the Edgewood and Brookland neighborhoods in Washington, D.C.
 USNS Charles Drew, a dry cargo ship of the United States Navy
 Parc Charles-Drew, in Le Sud-Ouest, Montreal, Quebec, Canada
 In 2002, scholar Molefi Kete Asante listed Drew as one of the 100 Greatest African Americans.

Numerous schools and health-related facilities, as well as other institutions, have been named in honor of Dr. Drew, including the Martin Luther King Jr./Drew Medical Center in Los Angeles.

Medical and higher education
 In 1966, the Charles R. Drew Postgraduate Medical School was incorporated in California and was named in his honor. This later became the Charles R. Drew University of Medicine and Science.
 Charles Drew Health Center, Omaha, Nebraska
 Charles Drew Science Enrichment Laboratory, Michigan State University, East Lansing, Michigan
 Charles Drew Health Foundation, East Palo Alto, California, 1960s–2000, was the community's only clinic for decades.
 Charles Drew Community Health Center, located in Burlington, NC near the site of the old Alamance County hospital.
 Charles Drew Pre-Health Society, University of Rochester
 Charles R Drew Wellness Center in Columbia, South Carolina
 Dr. Charles Drew Red Cross Blood and Platelet Donation Center in Washington D.C.
 Charles R. Drew Hall, an all-male freshman dorm at Howard University, Washington D.C.
 Charles Drew Memorial Cultural House, residence at Amherst College, his alma mater
 Charles Drew Premedical Society at Columbia University, New York

K-12 schools

 Charles R. Drew Middle School & Magnet school for the gifted, opened 1966 Los Angeles Unified School District Charles R. Drew Middle School
 Charles R. Drew Middle School Lincoln Alabama operated by Talladega County Schools
 Charles R. Drew Junior High School, Detroit, Michigan
 Dr. Charles R. Drew Science Magnet School, Buffalo, NY
 Charles R. Drew Elementary School, Miami Beach and Pompano Beach, Florida
 Bluford Drew Jemison S.T.E.M Academy, Baltimore (closed in 2013)
 Bluford Drew Jemison STEM Academy West, a Middle/High School in Baltimore, Maryland
 Dr. Charles R. Drew Elementary School, Colesville, Maryland
 Charles Drew Elementary School, Washington, DC
 Charles R. Drew Elementary School, Arlington, Virginia
 Dr. Charles Drew Elementary School, New Orleans, LA
 Charles R. Drew Charter School opened in August 2000 as the first charter school in Atlanta, Georgia
 Dr. Charles Drew Academy, Ecorse, MI
 Drew Academy, Houston, Texas Aldine ISD
 Charles R. Drew Intermediate School, Crosby, Texas
 Dr. Charles Drew Elementary School, San Francisco, Ca.
 Charles Richard Drew Intermediate School / Charles Richard Drew Educational Campus, Bronx, New York

References 
Notes

Further reading
 Love, Spencie (1996), One Blood: The Death and Resurrection of Charles R. Drew, Chapel Hill: University of North Carolina Press, (1997 reprint) 
 Organ, Claude H., editor (1987), A Century of Black Surgeons: The USA Experience, Transcript Press, Vol. I, Asa G. Yancey, Sr., Chapter 2: The Life Of Charles R. Drew, MD, .
 Schraff, Anne E. (2003), Dr. Charles Drew: Blood Bank Innovator, Enslow, 
 Wynes, Charles E. (1988), Charles Richard Drew: The Man and the Myth, University of Illinois Press,

External links 

 SBAS Charles Drew – Black American Medical Pioneer
 "Biography of Charles R. Drew", Charles R. Drew University of Medicine and Science
 "Charles R. Drew Papers", online collection by the National Library of Medicine, Profiles in Science
 "Charles R. Drew", The Straight Dope
 Charles Drew, Florida State University
 Charles Drew – The Black Inventor, Online Museum
 "Charles R. Drew Collection" , Nauck/Green Valley Heritage Project. Arlington Public Library, Arlington County, the Drew School, and the Nauck Civic Association.
 
 The story of Drew and plasma transfusion is retold in the radio drama "Transfusion", a presentation from Destination Freedom

1904 births
1950 deaths
20th-century American physicians
African-American coaches of American football
African-American college athletic directors in the United States
African-American physicians
African-American scientists
American medical researchers
American surgeons
Amherst College alumni
Columbia University Vagelos College of Physicians and Surgeons alumni
McGill University Faculty of Medicine alumni
Morgan State Bears athletic directors
Morgan State Bears football coaches
People from Washington, D.C.
Road incident deaths in North Carolina
Spingarn Medal winners
Dunbar High School (Washington, D.C.) alumni
20th-century surgeons
20th-century African-American people